Paucartambo District (from Quechua: Pawqar Tampu, meaning "colored tambo") is one of thirteen districts of the province Pasco in Peru.

Geography 
Other mountains are listed below:

See also 
 Kunturmarka

References